Mindy Finn (born February 10, 1981) is an American digital media expert, political and technology consultant, and entrepreneur. She worked as a digital strategist for the Republican Party, most notably for George W. Bush and Mitt Romney's presidential campaigns in 2004 and 2008, respectively, and became the vice presidential candidate for Evan McMullin's 2016 presidential campaign. She co-founded the organizations Stand Up Republic and Empowered Women, and works to make elections more inclusive.

Early life and education
Finn was born in Houston and raised as an only child by her single mother in Kingwood, Texas. She attended Kingwood High School, where she was a member of the drill team and National Honor Society, as well as a math tutor. Finn earned her bachelor's degree in journalism from Boston University, and a master's degree in political management at George Washington University (GWU). She was named a fellow at GWU's Institute of Politics, Democracy and the Internet in 2007.

Career
Early in her career, Finn was a journalist and worked as congressional correspondent for the Republican-American, a family-owned newspaper based in Waterbury, Connecticut. She started as an intern on the same day as the September 11 attacks (2001), which she covered by writing a series of front-page articles. She transitioned from journalism to politics, working on Capitol Hill for Lamar Smith and others. Finn later served as a digital strategist for the Republican Party, working on operations programs for George W. Bush's 2004 presidential campaign and leading digital efforts for Mitt Romney's 2008 president campaign. She co-founded the digital fundraising and media firm Engage with Patrick Ruffini. During 2011–2013, she helped Twitter develop strategic partnerships in Washington, D.C. She has also completed strategic work for the Republican National Committee and Google.

Finn founded the nonprofit organization Empowered Women in 2015, which seeks to promote discussion around feminism and women's empowerment throughout the U.S. She continued to serve as president, as of 2016. Shushannah Walshe of ABC News described the organization as "a network to connect center-right and independent women", and Elle Rachael Combe called Finn "one of the few people outside of liberal circles actively organizing women under a feminist banner". Finn has also advocated for more women, especially conservatives, to run for office. She also served on the Democracy Fund's bipartisan National Advisory Committee in 2016. Finn speaks about politics and technology and has appeared on media outlets such as C-SPAN, Fox News, MSNBC, and NPR. 

Finn was a vice presidential candidate for Evan McMullin's 2016 presidential campaign. Finn, who previously considered herself a "lifelong" Republican, distanced herself from the party under Donald Trump and other leaders, including Mitch McConnell and Paul Ryan. She was an early member of the Never Trump movement, and helped form a political action committee to support the movement. She has been credited for launching the 'NeverTrump' hashtag, and has been described as the "new face of the 'never Trump' Republicans". She also studied the nativism fueling Trump's rise. As a candidate, Finn advocated for paid time off for women, child care improvements, and tax law simplification. She also supported entitlement reform efforts around Social Security.

In 2017, Finn and McMullin co-founded Stand Up Republic, which seeks to strengthen democracy in the U.S. Finn became executive director of the government accountability organization, which has chapters in eighteen U.S. states, as of 2020. Stand Up Republic has worked to defeat select Republican politicians, including Dan Bishop, Roy Moore, Devin Nunes, and Steve King, and supported the impeachment of Trump. In 2020, she was named one of sixteen inaugural Brewer Fellows to Unite America, a fellowship established by the Woodrow Wilson National Fellowship Foundation in partnership with Cultivate the Karass and the Unite America Fund. She founded and serves as chief executive of Citizen Data.

Recognition
Finn was named one of the "50 Politicos to Watch" by Politico in 2011. She was also included in the news organization's list of "top tweeters". Molly Ball described Finn's Twitter feed as "a cross section of her wide-ranging reading list, peppered with personal observations", and Finn had 4,650 followers, as of July 2011. For co-founding Engage, and for her work for Twitter, Washingtonian named Finn one of the "top 100 tech titans... mostly for her ability to mesh government and online strategy together". In 2013, Grace Wyler and Brett LoGiurato of Business Insider included Finn in their list of "the 50 hottest people in online politics" for her political and advocacy work on Twitter, writing, "Finn has played a key role in making Twitter the go-to social media platform in the political sphere."

In 2017, Finn was one of eight recipients of the George Washington Alumni Association's Distinguished Alumni Achievement Award.

Personal life
Finn is Jewish and married with two sons and one daughter. She lives in Washington, D.C., as of 2017.

References

Further reading

External links

 Mindy Finn at C-SPAN
 Mindy Finn at IMDb

1981 births
Living people
People from Kingwood, Texas
People from Washington, D.C.
American women chief executives
Boston University alumni
George Washington University alumni
Journalists from Texas
American political consultants
American women journalists
Jewish American journalists
Jewish American candidates for Vice President of the United States
Female candidates for Vice President of the United States
2016 United States vice-presidential candidates
Independent politicians in the United States
21st-century American journalists
21st-century American women politicians
21st-century American politicians
21st-century American businesswomen
21st-century American businesspeople